John Lowell (October 18, 1824 – May 14, 1897) was a United States circuit judge of the United States Circuit Courts for the First Circuit and previously was a United States District Judge of the United States District Court for the District of Massachusetts.

Education and career

Born on October 18, 1824, in Boston, Massachusetts, Lowell received an Artium Baccalaureus degree in 1843 from Harvard University and a Bachelor of Laws in 1845 from Harvard Law School. He entered private practice in Boston from 1846 to 1865. He was editor of the Monthly Law Reporter from 1856 to 1860.

Federal judicial service

Lowell was nominated by President Abraham Lincoln on March 11, 1865, to a seat on the United States District Court for the District of Massachusetts vacated by Judge Peleg Sprague. He was confirmed by the United States Senate on March 11, 1865, and received his commission the same day. His service terminated on January 9, 1879, due to his elevation to the First Circuit.

Lowell was nominated by President Rutherford B. Hayes on December 16, 1878, to a seat on the United States Circuit Courts for the First Circuit vacated by Judge George Foster Shepley. He was confirmed by the Senate on December 18, 1878, and received his commission the same day. His service terminated on May 1, 1884, due to his resignation.

Later career and death

Following his resignation from the federal bench, Lowell resumed private practice in Boston from 1884 to 1897. He died on May 14, 1897, in Brookline, Massachusetts.

Family

Boston-born Lowell was the son of John Amory Lowell (1798–1881), the philanthropist, and his wife Susan Cabot Lowell (1801–1827). His parents were first cousins, both having as their paternal grandfather, Judge John Lowell (1743–1802). He was the father of James Arnold Lowell (1869-1933), and grandfather of Ralph Lowell through his eldest son John (1856–1922).

See also
 Lowell family
 First Families of Boston

References

Sources
 

1824 births
1897 deaths
19th-century American judges
19th-century American politicians
Harvard Law School alumni
Judges of the United States circuit courts
Judges of the United States District Court for the District of Massachusetts
Lawyers from Boston
People from Brookline, Massachusetts
United States federal judges appointed by Abraham Lincoln
United States federal judges appointed by Rutherford B. Hayes
Harvard College alumni